Bucharest Henri Coandă International Airport  is Romania's busiest international airport, located in Otopeni,  north of Bucharest's city centre. It is currently one of the two airports serving the capital of Romania. The other is Aurel Vlaicu Airport, which no longer serves scheduled passenger traffic.

The airport is named after Romanian flight pioneer Henri Coandă, builder of Coandă-1910 aircraft and discoverer of the Coandă effect of fluidics. Prior to May 2004, the official name was Bucharest Otopeni International Airport (Romanian: Aeroportul Internațional București Otopeni). Henri Coandă International Airport serves as headquarters for TAROM, the country's national airline. It also serves as a base of operations for low-cost airlines Animawings, Ryanair and Wizz Air and charter airlines Air Bucharest. It is managed by The National Company Bucharest Airports S.A. (Compania Națională Aeroporturi București S.A.). The military section of the airport is used by the 90th Airlift Flotilla of the Romanian Air Force.

History

Early years

During World War II, the airport in Otopeni was used as an airbase by the German Air Force. Until 1965, it was a major airfield for the Romanian Air Force, with Băneasa Airport serving as Bucharest's commercial airport. In 1965, with the growth of air traffic, the Otopeni airbase was converted to a commercial airport.

In August 1969, when United States President Richard Nixon visited Romania, a VIP lounge was inaugurated. A new passenger terminal (designed by Cezar Lăzărescu), with a capacity of 1,200,000 passengers per year, was opened on 13 April 1970, for domestic and international flights. An improvement program added a second runway in 1986, expanding capacity to 35 aircraft movements per hour.

In 1992, Otopeni Airport became a regular member of Airports Council International (ACI).

Expansion since the 1990s
The first stage of the plan (Phase I), taking place between 1994 and 1998, involved the construction of a new departures terminal and of a new airside concourse with five jetways and nine gates (referred to as 'the Finger') as well as the extension of airport ramps and of their associated taxiways.

The second phase (labeled Phase II/IIe) of the plan led to the construction of a terminal dedicated to domestic flights and of a multi-story car park (2003), the complete overhaul of the control tower (between 2005 and 2007) as well as the transformation of the old terminal building in a dedicated arrivals hall (in 2000). During the same phase, two high-speed taxiways (Victor and Whiskey) were constructed. Phase II was completed in 2007.

Meanwhile, TAROM axed its service to New York City in November 2003, as it was losing a great deal of money on the flight. Delta Air Lines began flying the same route four years later with Boeing 767s. In late 2008, the company decided to suspend the link that winter and resume it seasonally in summer 2009. The 2009 season started in June and was supposed to run until October; however, Delta pulled out of Bucharest altogether in September. According to a representative of Delta's joint-venture partner Air France–KLM, the carrier made this decision due to the recession and the poor financial performance of the service.

The third stage of the plan (Phase III), which started in 2009, involved the extension of the airside concourse ('the Finger') with 15 new gates (nine of which have jetways), as well as the expansion of the Departure Hall (with 8 new gates).

In March 2012, all air traffic except for business air traffic was transferred from Aurel Vlaicu International Airport (at that time Bucharest's low-cost hub) to Henri Coandă International Airport. Air Canada Rouge introduced seasonal routes to Toronto and Montreal in June 2018.

Terminals
The airport's facilities consist of a single terminal with three main facilities (colloquially referred to as "Terminals"): the Departures Hall/Terminal, the Arrivals Hall/Terminal, and the Finger Terminal (the airside concourse). A walkway with shops connects the departures and arrivals buildings. The airside concourse is organized in two (domestic and international) passengers flows.

Future development
Beyond Phase III, a new terminal building (Henri Coandă 2) at the eastern end of the current location is envisaged. The new building is expected to include a large commercial space. Henri Coandă 2 will be of a modular design, consisting of four separate buildings, each capable of handling 5 million passengers annually. Each module will be built as traffic demands dictate. By 2030, Terminal 2 alone should be able to handle the expected volume of 20 million passengers per year. The terminal will be directly connected to the A3 motorway and to the railway system. However, the plans might get delayed due to funding problems. There is a chance however that, if funds can be allocated in time, the airport can open its new terminal by 2025.

On 18 January 2021, it has been announced that the airport purchased all the land it needs in order to begin the expansion. However, due to the COVID-19 pandemic and Russian invasion of Ukraine, work is set to begin in 2023.

Airlines and destinations

Passenger
The following airlines operate regular scheduled and charter flights at Bucharest Henri Coandă Airport:

Cargo

Statistics

Passengers

In 2018, 13,824,830 passengers passed through the airport, an increase of 7.95% compared to 2017. In 2018, the airport handled 13.8 million passengers (63.3% of the total number of passengers carried by Romanian airports) and 39,534 tons of cargo (81.4% of the total amount of cargo handled by Romanian airports).

Busiest routes

Ground transportation

Rail
An airport rail link service to the main railway station, Gara de Nord (Bucharest North), runs from the Airport railway station located near the parking lot of the Arrivals hall. As of August 2021, the trains, alternately operated by CFR and TFC depart every 40 minutes, seven days a week. A one-way trip takes 15-20 minutes.

A new Metro Line M6 is also planned, connecting the airport to the Gara de Nord train station, and integrating the airport into the Bucharest Metro network.

Bus
Henri Coandă Airport is connected to the public transport company STB system. The 783 route provides express bus service to the city center (Piața Unirii). Route 783 to the city center is running 24 hours a day.

Car
The A3 motorway will connect the future terminal 2 and the city.

Taxi
As of May 2013, taxis serving Henri Coandă Airport can be ordered using a touch screen system in the arrivals terminal, allowing the taxi drivers to enter the pick-up area. This measure was taken after many complaints from passengers who were being ripped off when using illegal, high-price taxis.

Uber and Bolt are also available at the airport.

Incidents and accidents

On 31 March 1995, TAROM Flight 371, an Airbus A310-324 registered as YR-LCC, simultaneously experienced asymmetric thrust during climb and one of the pilots being incapacitated. The plane crashed near Baloteşti just two minutes after takeoff. All 60 people aboard were killed.
On 30 December 2007, a TAROM Boeing 737-300 (YR-BGC "Constanța"), flying Flight 3107 hit a car on the runway while taking off for Sharm-el-Sheikh. The aircraft stopped beside the runway and was severely damaged.

See also
List of the busiest airports in Europe by passenger traffic
List of the busiest airports in Romania
List of airports in Romania
Aviation in Romania
Transportation in Romania

References

External links

 Official website
 Google Map – Aerial View
 

Transport in Bucharest
Airports in Romania
Buildings and structures in Ilfov County
Modernist architecture in Romania
Airports established in 1965
1965 establishments in Romania
Henri Coandă